Dennis "Copper" Barth (1951– May 1978) was a gangster in Jamaica, who operated out of the Rennock Lodge area in east Kingston. Barth is mentioned in the lyrics of Super Cat's dancehall reggae
song "Ghetto Red Hot": "Kingston we deh when Massop get shot / We deh when Copper get shot”, referring to Claude “Claudie" Massop and Barth, who made gang peace treaty in the 1970s.

Death
Barth was convicted of killing two policemen and escaped from jails twice. Copper was killed in a shootout with police at the Caymanas Park race track in 1978.

Referenced

1951 births
1978 deaths
Escapees
Fugitives
Fugitives wanted by Jamaica
Jamaican people convicted of murder
People convicted of murdering police officers
People shot dead by law enforcement officers in Jamaica
Jamaican escapees
Escapees from Jamaican detention